Abhimanyu is a tragic hero in the Hindu epic the Mahabharata.

Abhimanyu may also refer to:

People 
 Abhimanyu Dassani (born 1990), Indian actor
 Abhimanyu Mishra (born 2009), American chess grandmaster
 Abhimanyu Mithun (born 1989), Indian international cricketer
 Abhimanyu Puranik (born 2000), Indian chess grandmaster
 Abhimanyu Rajp (born 1986), Indian born American cricketer
 Abhimanyu Sindhu (born 1967), Indian politician of the Bhartiya Janata Party (BJP)
 Abhimanyu Singh (born 1974), Indian actor
 Abhimanyu Singh Arha, Indian environmental historian
 Syahrian Abimanyu, Indonesian footballer

Films 
Abhimanyu (1936 film), Tamil film starring M. G. Ramachandran
Abhimanyu (1948 film), Tamil film directed by A. Kasilingam
Abhimanyu (1980 film), Hindi film directed by Mahesh Bhatt
Abhimanyu (1983 film), Bengali film directed by Tapan Sinha
Abhimanyu (1989 film), Hindi film directed by Tony Juneja
Abhimanyu (1990 film), Kannada film directed by Raviraj
Abhimanyu (1990 Bengali film), Bengali film directed by Biplab Chatterjee
Abhimanyu (1991 film), Malayalam film directed by Priyadarshan
Abhimanyu (1997 film), Tamil film directed by K. Subash
Abhimanyu (2006 film), Bengali film directed by Swapan Saha
Abhimanyu (2003 film), Telugu film directed by Mallikarjun
Abhimanyu (2009 film), Oriya directed by Sushant Mani
Abhimanyu (2014 film), Kannada language film directed by Arjun Sarja